Quiet Dell is an unincorporated community in Harrison County, West Virginia, United States.

Community 
The community's name is descriptive. The area is primarily single-family residential in nature on large lots. 

Key retail businesses in Quiet Dell include  the 7-Eleven-BP and Exxon gas stations, Dollar General, and Stonewood Bulk Foods. Several businesses related to the oil and gas industry are based within the community.

Tourist attractions include the Civilian Conservation Corps (CCC) Museum in the old school, and Primitives, a crafting cooperative. The historic Quiet Dell United Methodist Church, dating from 1896, is also located here.

History 
In 1931, Quiet Dell was the scene of multiple murders committed by serial killer Harry Powers.

The Quiet Dell School was listed on the National Register of Historic Places in 2001.

References

Unincorporated communities in Harrison County, West Virginia
Unincorporated communities in West Virginia